The 1910–11 Northern Rugby Football Union season was the 16th season of rugby league football.

Season summary

Oldham won their third Championship, and second in a row, after defeating Wigan 20-7 in the Play Off Final.  Wigan had ended the regular season in the top position, but only after it had been decided by a one-off play-off with Oldham that Wigan won 11-3.

The Challenge Cup winners were Broughton Rangers who defeated Wigan 4-0.

Coventry replaced Treherbert.

Wigan won the Lancashire League, and Wakefield Trinity won the Yorkshire League. Oldham beat Swinton 4–3 to win the Lancashire Cup, and Wakefield Trinity beat Huddersfield 8–2 to win the Yorkshire County Cup.

Championship

Championship play-off

Challenge Cup

Broughton Rangers defeated Wigan 4-0 to win their second, and to date, last Challenge Cup.

The scoreline set a record for the lowest winning score and lowest aggregate score in a Challenge Cup Final.

Sources
1910-11 Rugby Football League season at wigan.rlfans.com
The Challenge Cup at The Rugby Football League website

References

1910 in English rugby league
1911 in English rugby league
Northern Rugby Football Union seasons
1910 in Welsh rugby league
1911 in Welsh rugby league